Caddell is a surname. Notable people with the surname include:

James Caddell (1794–1826), New Zealand Pākehā Māori, sealer and interpreter
Jason Caddell, guitarist in The Dismemberment Plan, a Washington D.C. based indie rock band
John B. Caddell, after whom the ship John B. Caddell was named
Patrick Caddell (1950–2019), American public opinion pollster and a political film consultant
Shirley Caddell (1931–2010), American country music and rockabilly singer, yodeller, guitarist and songwriter
Trevor Caddell (born 1993), American professional wrestler, better known by the ring name Trevor Lee
Walter Caddell (1879–1944), British military officer

See also
Cadell